Jereleen Michell Pereira (born 12 August 1982) is a Sri Lankan woman cricketer. She was a member of the Sri Lankan cricket team at the 2005 Women's Cricket World Cup.

References

External links 
 

1982 births
Living people
Sri Lankan women cricketers
Sri Lanka women One Day International cricketers
Colts Cricket Club cricketers
People from Trincomalee